Allonne is a commune in the Deux-Sèvres department in the Nouvelle-Aquitaine region in western France. It is situated some 5 km southeast of Secondigny and 14 km southwest of the town of Parthenay.

See also
Communes of the Deux-Sèvres department

References

Communes of Deux-Sèvres